Artamene was an opera in three acts by Tomaso Albinoni set to a libretto by Bartolomeo Vitturi. Composed in 1740, it premiered in Venice at the Teatro Sant'Angelo in the 1741 carnival season. It was Albinoni's last opera. The music is lost.

Sources

Operas
1741 operas
Italian-language operas
Operas by Tomaso Albinoni